The Princeton Tigers men's ice hockey team is a National Collegiate Athletic Association (NCAA) Division I college ice hockey program that represents Princeton University. The Tigers are a member of ECAC Hockey. They play at the Hobey Baker Memorial Rink in Princeton, New Jersey. In 1999, future NHL player Jeff Halpern scored 22 goals to tie for the most goals in the ECAC and was co-winner of Princeton's Roper Trophy for athletic and academic achievement. In 2010–11, Andrew Calof was ECAC Rookie of the Year.

History

Princeton University had an ice hockey team organized already during the 1894–95 season, when the school still went by the name of College of New Jersey. On March 3, 1895 the university ice hockey team faced a Baltimore aggregation at the North Avenue Ice Palace in Baltimore, Maryland and won by a score of 5–0. The players on the 1895 team were Chester Derr, John Brooks, Howard Colby, James Blair, Frederick Allen, Ralph Hoagland and Art Wheeler.

For the 1899–1900 season the Princeton University ice hockey team became a member of the Intercollegiate Hockey League (ICHL) where they played organized league games against other Ivy League school teams such as Brown, Columbia, Cornell, Dartmouth, Harvard, University of Pennsylvania and Yale.

Princeton's most famous ice hockey player Hobey Baker (1892–1918) played for the school team between 1911 and 1914, before he graduated and went on to play for the New York City based St. Nicholas Hockey Club.

As many college programs did, Princeton's ice hockey squad suspended operations for the 1917–18 season due to the United States entering World War I but the icers returned after the armistice was signed. A few years later the Tigers hired their first head coach, Russell O. Ellis, but they would go through several more before they could find someone to lead the program for more than a few years. Despite the tumult behind the bench Princeton was still producing some of the best teams in college hockey, setting a program record of 15 wins that would stand for 76 years.

In the midst of the great depression Richard Vaughan came to Princeton and would helm the team for the next quarter-century. Vaughan would keep the Tigers competitive through much of his tenure and his 159 wins remains a program high 60 years after his retirement. Princeton found it difficult to replace Vaughan, going through 5 coaches in 18 years while producing only two winning records in that time. The team's nadir came under Bill Quackenbush who, despite ending up in the Hall of Fame as a player, was the program's worst coach as far as records go. Quackenbush's tenure began well with Princeton making the ECAC Tournament for the first time, but the following season the team slid to 16th in the conference and would not win more than 5 games a year for the next 5 seasons. Quackenbush remained with the program even after a 1–22 season but resigned in 1973 with the Tigers an afterthought in ECAC Hockey. Princeton would not play another postseason game until 1985, the year after 7 teams left to form Hockey East, and they would not win a playoff game until 1992 under first-year head coach Don Cahoon.

During Cahoon's time at Princeton the program recovered from decades as a bottom-feeder and in 1995 produced their first winning season in 27 years. Three seasons later the Tigers won their first conference tournament and made the NCAA Tournament for the first time. After Cahoon left to head Massachusetts in 2000, he was replaced by long-time assistant Len Quesnelle but after four years the team was back at the bottom of the conference and he was swiftly replaced by Guy Gadowsky.

It took Gadowsky a few years to get the Tigers back on their feet but he led the team to its second conference championship in 2008, setting a program high with 21 wins that he bested by 1 the following year. Two years later Gadowsky left and was replaced by Bob Prier but just as had happened with Cahoon, the successor did not last long and after a dismal third season Ron Fogarty was hired as the 17th head coach in program history. As of 2019 Fogarty's best season came in 2018 when he led an underdog Tigers squad to their 3rd conference title.

Season-by-season results

Records vs. Current ECAC Hockey Teams 
As of the completion of 2018–19 season

All-time coaching records 
As of completion of 2022–23 season

Statistical leaders
The team's statistical leaders are as follows.

Career points leaders

Career Goaltending Leaders

GP = Games played; Min = Minutes played; W = Wins; L = Losses; T = Ties; GA = Goals against; SO = Shutouts; SV% = Save percentage; GAA = Goals against average

Minimum 30 games

Statistics current through the start of the 2019–20 season.

Roster
As of September 8, 2022.

Awards and honors

Hockey Hall of Fame

Hobey Baker (1945)

US Hockey Hall of Fame

Hobey Baker (1973)

NCAA

All-Americans
AHCA First Team All-Americans

1952-53: Hank Bothfeld, F
1985-86: Cliff Abrecht, D
2007-08: Mike Moore, D; Lee Jubinville, F
2018-19: Ryan Kuffner, F

AHCA Second Team All-Americans

1997-98: Steve Shirreffs, D
2008-09: Zane Kalemba, G
2010-11: Taylor Fedun, D
2017-18: Ryan Kuffner, F; Max Véronneau, F

ECAC Hockey

Individual awards

Player of the Year
 Lee Jubinville: 2008
 Zane Kalemba: 2009

Rookie of the Year
 John Messuri: 1986
 Andre Faust: 1989
 Andrew Calof: 2011

Best Defensive Defenseman
 Mike Moore: 2008
 Danny Biega: 2012

Best Defensive Forward
 Ian Sharp: 1994, 1995
 Syl Apps III: 1999

Ken Dryden Award
 Zane Kalemba: 2009

Student-Athlete of the Year
 Landis Stankievech: 2008

Tim Taylor Award
 Guy Gadowsky: 2008

Most Outstanding Player in Tournament
 Jeff Halpern: 1998
 Zane Kalemba: 2008
 Ryan Ferland: 2018

All-Conference
First Team All-ECAC Hockey

 1985–86: Cliff Abrecht, D
 1987–88: John Messuri, F
 1997–98: Steve Shirreffs, F
 2004–05: Luc Paquin, D
 2007–08: Mike Moore, D; Lee Jubinville, F
 2008–09: Zane Kalemba, G
 2010–11: Taylor Fedun, D
 2017–18: Max Véronneau, F
 2018–19: Ryan Kuffner, F

Second Team All-ECAC Hockey

 1961–62: John Cook, F
 1962–63: John Cook, F
 1967–68: Thomas Rawls, D
 1986–87: John Messuri, F
 1989–90: Mike McKee, D; Andre Faust, F; Greg Polaski, F
 1991–92: Andre Faust, F
 1993–94: Sean O'Brien, D
 1997–98: Jeff Halpern, F
 1998–99: Steve Shirreffs, D; Jeff Halpern, F
 1999–2000: Kirk Lamb, F
 2004–05: Dustin Sproat, F
 2007–08: Brett Wilson, F
 2009–10: Taylor Fedun, D
 2011–12: Michael Sdao, D
 2012–13: Andrew Calof, F
 2016–17: Max Véronneau, F
 2017–18: Ryan Kuffner, F
 2018–19: Max Véronneau, F

Third Team All-ECAC Hockey

 2005–06: Eric Leroux, G; Grant Goeckner-Zoeller, F
 2008–09: Jody Peterson, D
 2010–11: Andrew Calof, F
 2017–18: Josh Teves, D
 2018–19: Josh Teves, D

ECAC Hockey All-Rookie Team

 1987–88: Mark Salsbury, G; Andy Cesarski, D
 1988–89: Mike McKee, D; Andre Faust, F
 1990–91: Rob Laferriere, F
 1992–93: Jason Smith, D
 1994–95: Casson Masters, D
 1996–97: Dominique Auger, D
 2005–06: Brett Wilson, F
 2010–11: Andrew Calof, F
 2015–16: Ryan Kuffner, F
 2016–17: Jackson Cressey, F

Olympians
This is a list of Princeton alumni who have played on an Olympic team.

† denotes the AAU team that marched in the opening ceremony but did not participate.

Tigers in the NHL
As of July 1, 2022.

† Jeff Halpern won a Stanley Cup as an assistant coach with the Tampa Bay Lightning in 2020.

Source:

See also
Princeton Tigers women's ice hockey
Princeton Tigers
Hobey Baker Award

References

External links
Tigers men's ice hockey

 
Ice hockey teams in New Jersey